Owen Livesey (born 3 August 1991) is a British judoka, submission grappler, wrestler and mixed martial artist. He notably competed in judo at an international level for Great Britain and England and won a gold medal at the 2014 Commonwealth Games in Glasgow in the Men's 81kg judo. He also competes in submission grappling and wrestling tournaments across Europe.

Personal history 
Owen Livesey was born on 3 August 1991 in St Helens, Merseyside. Livesey has two sisters, named Bekky Livesey and Amy Livesey, both of whom participate in judo and have both won British championships at half-middleweight.

Judo career 

Prior to becoming a judoka, Livesey was a participant in rugby league. He had hoped to be selected to represent Great Britain at the 2012 Olympic Games held in London, but was not, a disappointment which made Livesey ponder his continuation of the sport. Livesey is a 2nd dan black belt in judo, gaining his 1st dan at the age of 16, and trained at SKK Judo Club where he was coached by Peter Blood and Luke Preston.

At the 2014 Commonwealth Games held in Glasgow, Scotland, Livesey defeated John Muthee of Kenya in the round of 16. The quarter-final was against Zambia's Boas Munyonga, and in the semi-finals Canadian Jonah Burt was beaten. The final was against compatriot Tom Reed, which Livesey won in a five-minute bout.

He is a three times champion of Great Britain, winning the half-middleweight division at the British Judo Championships in 2013, 2014 and 2017.

Professional grappling career
Owen has found success in Brazilian jiu-jitsu and wrestling competition, first competing for Polaris Pro Grappling at Polaris 18 on November 27, 2021, defeating Max Bickerton on the preliminary card. He returned at the promotion's next event on March 26, 2022 to compete against Freddie Vosgrone. Livesey won a unanimous decision against Vosgrone on the main card.

On May 21, 2022, Livesey competed won a unanimous decision against Michael Pixley at Grapplefest 12. He was then invited to return to Polaris to compete at Polaris 21 against ADCC veteran Josh Hinger on September 24, 2022.

Shortly after, Livesey was announced as the official alternate for the under 99kg division at the 2022 ADCC World Championship. He was given the call to compete with around a week's notice, as Luccas Lira Costa was forced to withdraw due to visa issues. Livesey was eliminated in the opening round by the eventual champion, Kaynan Duarte.

The following week on September 24, 2022, Livesey defeated Josh Hinger by split decision at Polaris 21. Livesey competed in the Polaris Middleweight Grand Prix on November 25, 2022. He was submitted by Hunter Colvin in the opening round.

On March 11, 2023, Livesey was booked to compete against UFC world champion Chris Weidman in the main event of Polaris 23. He won the match by unanimous decision.

Mixed martial arts career
Livesey made his professional mixed martial arts debut in April 2021, beating Liam Gregory by TKO in the first round.

References 

1991 births
Living people
English male judoka
Commonwealth Games gold medallists for England
Judoka at the 2014 Commonwealth Games
Sportspeople from St Helens, Merseyside
Commonwealth Games medallists in judo
European Games competitors for Great Britain
Judoka at the 2015 European Games
Medallists at the 2014 Commonwealth Games